German submarine U-1203 was a Type VIIC U-boat built for Nazi Germany's Kriegsmarine for service during World War II.
She was laid down on 15 May 1943 by Schichau-Werke, Danzig as yard number 1573, launched on 9 December 1943 and commissioned on 10 February 1944 under Oberleutnant zur See Erich Steinbrink.

Design
German Type VIIC submarines were preceded by the shorter Type VIIB submarines. U-1203 had a displacement of  when at the surface and  while submerged. She had two shafts and two  propellers.

U-1203 was fitted with five  torpedo tubes (four fitted at the bow and one at the stern), fourteen torpedoes, one  SK C/35 naval gun, (220 rounds), one  Flak M42 and two twin  C/30 anti-aircraft guns. The boat had a complement of between forty-four and sixty.

Service history
The boat's career began with training at 8th Flotilla on 10 February 1944, followed by active service on 1 December 1944 as part of the 11th Flotilla.

Wolfpacks
U-1203 took part in no wolfpacks.

Fate
U-1203 surrendered on 9 May 1945 in Trondheim.

Summary of raiding history

References

Bibliography

External links

German Type VIIC submarines
1943 ships
U-boats commissioned in 1944
U-boats sunk in 1945
World War II submarines of Germany
Ships built in Danzig
U-boats sunk by British warships
Operation Deadlight
Maritime incidents in December 1945
Ships built by Schichau